Music City Soul is the fifth studio album by British singer-songwriter Beverley Knight. It was released on Parlophone Records on 7 May 2007 in the United Kingdom. The album contains the singles "No Man's Land", "After You" and "The Queen of Starting Over", and features Ronnie Wood on a number of tracks. The album became Knight's second highest charting album in the UK, peaking at number eight.

Background
The majority of Music City Soul was recorded and produced by Mark Nevers at The Beech House studio in Nashville, Tennessee in the United States in just five days in late October 2006. All the songs on the album were written beforehand the previous summer and then recorded back to back in the studio with an array of different musicians. The intention was to create an organic sound reminiscent of classic 1960s soul albums that epitomised releases by artists such as Aretha Franklin, Sam Cooke and Al Green, who had influenced Knight as a child. The album was titled Music City Soul to reflect the fact that Knight has returned to her soul and gospel roots. It was also intended to pay homage to Nashville, the city it was recorded in, which is often referred to as 'The Music City' due to its rich musical heritage.

Crtitical reception

Music City Soul received generally mixed to positive reviews from music critics. Allmusic editor Jon O'Brien rated the album three stars out of five and remarked that "whether it's a knee-jerk response to the disappointing sales of her 'all-bases-covered' predecessor, or a genuine affectionate homage to the likes of Al Green, Sam Cooke, and Aretha Franklin, its 15 tracks are undeniably and authentically old-school, thanks to Mark Nevers' organic production, Knight's full-throttled soulful vocals, and an inspired choice of collaborators and song choices."

Track listing

Personnel 

 Paul Bruce – bass
 Paul Burch – percussion and acoustic guitar
 Jamal Carter – backing vocals
 Bryan Chambers – backing vocals
 Janice Coeder – backing vocals
 Pete Cummings – electric guitar
 Ann McCrary – backing vocals
 Brian Kotzur – drums
 Duane Denison – electric guitar
 Alex Garnett – saxophone
 Billy Godfrey – backing vocals
 Carlos Hercules – drums
 Jimmy Hogarth – guitar

 James Long – electric guitar
 Derrick Lee – piano, keyboards
 Daniel Marsden – trumpet
 Louise Marsden – backing vocals
 Mark Nevers – engineering, production
 Paul Reide – guitar
 Luke Smith – Hammond B3 organ
 Bunt Stafford Clark – mastering
 Nichol Thomsom – trombone
 Stewart Trotman – Fender Rhodes
 Eg White – instruments
 Bobby Woods – piano, keyboards
 Ronnie Wood - guitar on "Every Time You See Me Smile", "Ain't That a Lot of Love" and "Black Butta"

Charts

Certifications

References

External links 
 Official website

Beverley Knight albums
2007 albums